Hammersmith Head is a rowing head held by Auriol Kensington Rowing Club on the River Thames.  The race starts at Chiswick Bridge  and finishes at Hammersmith Bridge  (a course of approximately ).  It is held under Amateur Rowing Association Rules of Racing.

References

Head races